Waldemar John Gallman (April 27, 1899 Wellsville, New York – June 28, 1980) was an American Career Foreign Service Officer who served as Ambassador Extraordinary and Plenipotentiary to Poland (1948–1950), South Africa (1951–1954) (Commissioned to the Union of South Africa), Iraq (1954 – 1958; Reaccredited when Iraq became a republic; presented new credentials on September 22, 1958. Commissioned as Ambassador Extraordinary and Plenipotentiary to the Arab Union on July 10, 1958, but did not take oath of office under that appointment, the Arab Union having been dissolved) and was Director General of the Foreign Service from November 17, 1958, until January 31, 1961.

Gallman graduated from Cornell University in 1921.

He was later a member of the Faculty of the George Washington University and author of “Iraq Under General Nuri: My Recollection of Nuri Al-Said, 1954–1958.”

References

External links
Boston University archives of his papers
Letter from Helen Keller to Waldemar J. Gallman in thanks for his assistance and hospitality.

United States Department of State officials
1899 births
1980 deaths
George Washington University faculty
People from Wellsville, New York
Ambassadors of the United States to Poland
Ambassadors of the United States to South Africa
Ambassadors of the United States to Iraq
20th-century American non-fiction writers
Cornell University alumni
Directors General of the United States Foreign Service
20th-century American male writers